Klutz is a publishing company started in Palo Alto, California in 1977. It was acquired by Nelvana in April 2000, and became a subsidiary of Scholastic Inc. in 2002.  The first Klutz book was a how-to guide titled Juggling for the Complete Klutz, which came provided with juggling beanbags attached in a mesh bag. The book was created by three friends who graduated from Stanford University: Darrell Lorentzen, John Cassidy, and B.C. Rimbeaux.  Since then, the company has continued to specialize in activity-driven books sold along with other items needed for the activity.  Not all the books are about developing a skill; there has also been a geography book containing, among other physical attachments, packets of rice corresponding to the average daily caloric intake among the poorest people of the world.  Many of their books are spiral bound and teach various crafts. The items needed are usually included with the book, e.g. the juggling guide. The Klutz credo is: Create wonderful things, be good, have fun.

Selected list of publications

Crafts
Capsters: Turn Bottle Caps into Cool Collectibles
Felted Friends: Create Your Own Soft, Fuzzy Animals
Knitting: Learn to Knit 6 Great Projects
Make Clay Charms
Mini Pom Pom Pets: Make Your Own Fuzzy Friends
Potholders and other Loopy Projects
Pom Pom Monster Salon
Pom Pom Puppies: Make Your Own Adorable Dogs
Spool Knit Jewelry
String Art: Transform String and Pins into Works of Art
Tissue Paper Crafts
Twirled Paper
Twirly Q's: Make Irresistible Cardboard Creations
Make Your Own Washi Tape Stickers
Window Art: Stick on! Peel off!

Fashion
Beaded Bands: Super Stylish Bracelets Made Simple
Bead Loom Bracelets: Learn to Make Beautiful Beaded Bracelets 
Fashion Forms: Let Your Style Take Shape
Glossy Bands: Stretchy Bracelets to Share with Your Friends
Headbands and Hairstyles
Loop Loom Bracelets
Mini Capsters Jewelry: Turn Bottle Caps into Wearable Art
My Style Studio
Paper Fashions: Design Your Own Styles
Paper Fashions Fancy
Safety Pin Bracelets: Transform Safety Pins into Extraordinary Bracelets
A Book of Lanyard and Lacing: Scoubidou
Shrink Art Jewelry
Braids and Bows:  a Book of Instruction (how to braid hair)

Scientific
Air Power: Rocket Science Made Simple
Battery Science: Make Widgets that Work and Gadgets that Go
Explorabook: A Kid's Science Museum in a Book
Earthsearch: A Kid's Geography Museum in a Book 
Gotcha Gadgets: Build Electronic Gizmos to Play 20 Tricks
LEGO Chain Reactions: Design and Build Amazing Moving Machines
LEGO Crazy Action Contraptions
The Solar Car Book
Straw Shooter Jets: Make Your Own Mini Air Force

Featuring Unique Toys 
How to Make Monstrous, Huge, Unbelievably Big Bubbles
The Book of Impossible Objects: 25 Eye-Popping Projects to Make See & Do

How-to 
Cats Cradle
Juggling for the Complete Klutz
The Klutz Book of Animation
The Klutz Book of Knots
The Klutz Book of Paper Airplanes
The Klutz Book of Card Games (For Sharks and Others) (1990)
Tricky Video

Other
Doodle Journal
Doodle Journal: Write in White
Draw Star Wars: The Clone Wars
Kids Shenanigans
The Encyclopedia of Immaturity Volume I
The Encyclopedia of Immaturity Volume II
The Klutz Book of Inventions
The Klutz Book of Magic
Thumb Wars: The Ultimate Guide

References

External links 
 

Companies based in Palo Alto, California
Publishing companies established in 1977
Book publishing companies based in the San Francisco Bay Area
Former Corus Entertainment subsidiaries
Scholastic Corporation